Jacob Rene Mark (born 16 October 1991 in Køge) is a Danish politician, who is a member of the Folketing for the Socialist People's Party. He was elected into parliament at the 2015 Danish general election.

Political career
Mark sat in the municipal council of Køge Municipality from 2010 to 2015. In 2015 he was elected into parliament, receiving 2,948 personal votes at the general election. He was reelected in 2019 with 23,213 votes.

References

External links
 

Living people
1991 births
People from Køge Municipality
Danish municipal councillors
Socialist People's Party (Denmark) politicians
Members of the Folketing 2015–2019
Members of the Folketing 2019–2022
Members of the Folketing 2022–2026